Lieutenant General Sir Robert Henry Gervase Fulton,  (born 1948) is a retired British Royal Marines officer who served as Governor of Gibraltar from 2006 to 2009.

Career
Educated at Eton College and the University of East Anglia where he graduated with a Bachelor of Arts, Fulton joined the Royal Marines in 1972. After serving as a junior officer for a number of years, he was appointed to the Staff College at Warminster. He became a company commander in 42 Commando in 1983 and then undertook various staff appointments before joining the Directing Staff of the Army Staff College, Camberley in 1990.

Fulton was appointed commanding officer of 42 Commando in 1992, Assistant Director for CIS Operational Requirements in 1994, and a member of the Rapid Reaction Force Operations Staff in UNPROFOR in 1995. After attending the Royal College of Defence Studies and then the Higher Command and Staff Course in 1996, he became commander of 3 Commando Brigade in 1997, Commandant-General Royal Marines in 1998 and equipment capability manager at the Ministry of Defence in 2001. In 2003 was promoted to lieutenant general on appointment as Deputy Chief of the Defence Staff (Equipment Capability). He was knighted as a Knight Commander of the Order of the British Empire in the 2005 Birthday Honours.

In September 2006, Fulton took over as Governor of Gibraltar. He was Britain's first governor to witness change in the Gibraltar constitution since 1967. He was appointed a Knight of the Most Venerable Order of Saint John on 5 August 2009, and his term as governor ended in October 2009.

In April 2007 it was announced that Fulton would lead an enquiry into the capture of 15 British military personnel by Iranian forces; he reported to Parliament later that year.

A Freeman of the City of London, Fulton serves as a Court Assistant of the Worshipful Company of Haberdashers and, in July 2010, became chief executive officer of the Global Leadership Foundation.

Family
From a Devon family, Fulton married Midge Free in 1975 and they have two sons.

See also
 Politics of Gibraltar

References

|-

|-

|-

|-

|-
 

 
|-

1948 births
Graduates of the Royal College of Defence Studies
Graduates of the Staff College, Camberley
Living people
Alumni of the University of East Anglia
Royal Marines generals
Governors of Gibraltar
Knights Commander of the Order of the British Empire
Knights of the Order of St John